Arwyn Randall Davies, Baron Arwyn (17 April 1897 – 23 February 1978) was a Welsh Labour life peer.

He was a Chartered Mining Engineer, businessman and company director.

Marriage and family
He was married to Norah Davies, with children the Honourable Elizabeth Macnab, the Honourable Mary Webb and the Honourable Hugh Davies. 
He married secondly Beatrix Emily Bassett (née Organ).

Baron Arwyn
Davies took the name of Arwyn in lieu of Davies by Deed Poll on 14 December 1964 prior to being made a peer. On 29 December 1964, he was created a life peer as Baron Arwyn, of Glais in the County of Glamorgan. He was introduced to the House of Lords on 21 January 1965.

References

1897 births
1978 deaths
Arwyn
Life peers created by Elizabeth II